These are the results for the mixed doubles event at the 2014 Summer Youth Olympics.

Jil Teichmann of Switzerland and Jan Zieliński of Poland won the gold medal, defeating Ye Qiuyu of China and Jumpei Yamasaki of Japan in the final, 4–6, 6–3, [10–5].

Fanni Stollár of Hungary and Kamil Majchrzak of Poland won the bronze medal, defeating Ioana Ducu of Romania and Matías Zukas of Argentina in the bronze-medal match, 6–3, 3–6, [10–5].

Seeds

Main draw

Finals

Top half

Bottom half

References 
 Main draw

Mixed doubles